The 2012–13 Israeli Premier League was the fourteenth season since its introduction in 1999 and the 71st season of top-tier football in Israel. It began on 25 August 2012 and ended on 20 May 2013. Ironi Kiryat Shmona were the defending champions, having won their first Premier League title last season.

Maccabi Tel Aviv secured the title with a 2–0 win against Ironi Ramat HaSharon on 22 April 2012. This was their 19th Israeli league title, this win gave Maccabi Tel Aviv a 13-point advantage over the second-place team Maccabi Haifa with four more rounds to go.

Structural changes
There were three structural changes:
Only fourteen teams competed in this season, reducing from sixteen teams.
The top playoff were contested by six teams which were played against each other twice, and the bottom playoff was contested by eight teams which were played against each other once.
There were two relegated teams, and two promoted team from Liga Leumit.

Teams

A total of fourteen teams competed in the league, including thirteen sides from the 2011–12 season and one promoted team from the 2011–12 Liga Leumit.

Hapoel Petah Tikva, Hapoel Rishon LeZion, and Maccabi Petah Tikva were relegated to the 2012–13 Liga Leumit after finishing the 2011–12 season in the bottom three places.
Maccabi Petah Tikva were relegated after 21 straight seasons, Hapoel Petah Tikva after four years consecutively and Hapoel Rishon LeZion after just one year on the top division.

Hapoel Ramat Gan were promoted to the 2012–13 Israeli Premier League after beating Hapoel Bnei Lod in the 2011–12 Liga Leumit promotion playoff. They last played in the top division in the 2010–11 Season.

Stadia and locations

A: The club plays its home games at a neutral venue because their own ground does not meet Premier League requirements.
B: While Netanya Stadium was under construction. Maccabi Netanya hosted their home games in Ramat Gan Stadium until 6 October 2012.

Personnel and sponsorship

Managerial changes

 Arik Benado was acted as caretaker manager for eight days until his appointment as manager on 25 November 2012.

Regular season

Table

Results

Playoffs
Key numbers for pairing determination (number marks position after 26 games):

Top Playoff

Table

Results

Bottom Playoff

Table

Results

Season statistics

Top scorers

Source: Israel Football Association

Hat-tricks

 4 Player scored 4 goals

Scoring
First goal of the season:  Murad Abu Anza for F.C. Ashdod against Ironi Ramat HaSharon, 8th minute (25 August 2012)
Widest winning margin: 6 goals – Maccabi Haifa 6–0 Ironi Ramat HaSharon (2 April 2013)
Most goals scored by a losing team: 3 goals
Ironi Ramat HaSharon 3–4 Maccabi Tel Aviv (24 November 2012)
Maccabi Netanya 3–4 Ironi Kiryat Shmona (29 December 2012)
Maccabi Netanya 3–5 Bnei Yehuda (9 February 2013)
Most goals in a match by one player: 4 goals
 Dino Ndlovu for Maccabi Haifa against Ironi Ramat HaSharon (2 April 2013)
 Shimon Abuhatzira for Ironi Kiryat Shmona against Hapoel Tel Aviv (20 April 2013)

Discipline
First yellow card of the season:  Bojan Marković for Hapoel Be'er Sheva against Bnei Sakhnin, 9th minute (25 August 2012)
 Most yellow cards by a player: 13 –  Kobi Moyal (Beitar Jerusalem)
First red card of the season:  Dia Saba for Hapoel Be'er Sheva against Bnei Sakhnin, 89th minute (25 August 2012)
 Most red cards by a player: 2 –
 Mohammed Zbidat (Bnei Sakhnin)
 Elad Gabai (Ironi Kiryat Shmona)

Clean sheets
 Most clean sheets: 17
 Maccabi Tel Aviv
 Fewest clean sheets: 4
 Hapoel Ramat Gan

See also
2012–13 Israel State Cup
2012–13 Toto Cup Al

References

Israeli Premier League seasons
Israel
1